The Transformers (later retitled as Transformers) is a comic book line by IDW Publishing based upon Hasbro's Transformers characters and toy line, featuring many writers and artists across multiple series. It is notable for being the longest continuously running Transformers continuity to date, beginning in October 2005 with The Transformers: Infiltration and ending in November 2018, after the six-issue Unicron event comic. The following year, it would be rebooted and succeeded by a new comic book series on 2019.

IDW lost the license rights by the end of 2022.

Publication history

First era
Dreamwave Productions shut down on January 4, 2005, and announced they would cease publication of all their comics, leaving Transformers: Generation One and its prequel series, Transformers: The War Within incomplete. Chris Ryall, editor-in-chief of IDW Publishing, leaped at the chance to bid on the property. On May 19, 2005, Hasbro announced they had awarded the licensing rights to IDW Publishing, with plans for an issue #0 in October 2005 and an ongoing title entitled The Transformers: Infiltration to begin in January 2006. Beforehand, Ryall met up with long-time writer Simon Furman. Furman aimed for a contemporary version of the Generation 1 incarnation to appeal to new and old fans alike. They both cited a focus on the "Robots in Disguise" element of the characters, aiming to bring back their "myth and majesty". Overall, Furman described it as, "This was, at last (after 20-plus years) MY take on Transformers." Furman also aimed for a real time approach, using maps to help guide his stories. Infiltrations issue #0 sold 100,000 copies in pre-orders, a record for the company. Furman focused the story on Autobot medic Ratchet and broke new ground for G1-based storylines by excluding the Ark crash storyline and having them only just recently arrived deliberately, to give proper intent to the Transformers being on Earth, thus separating the fictional universe from the Beast Wars one. E. J. Su was hired as the artist, and was given free rein to re-design characters slightly.

Infiltration received mixed reviews. Furman's decision to put leaders Optimus Prime and Megatron on the sidelines divided fans, as did the slow pace and the use of human characters. Furman and Ryall responded positively, promising to make both fans and critics happy after reading various message board comments. The Transformers: Stormbringer followed in July, set around the same time frame as Infiltration, and had art by Don Figueroa. The four issue tale was intended to be a weekly event, but Diamond Comic Distributors' resistance meant it became monthly. Furman had planned to visit Cybertron later on, but the fans demanded a human-less story, and Stormbringer was written. Most importantly, the story revealed Cybertron to be dead, giving the saga a darker feel and explaining the status quo of Autobots and Decepticons spread out and fighting pocket wars. Furman intentionally wanted a larger scale and "took Cybertron out of the equation" to shape the overall arc. The story also allowed him to reinvent Thunderwing and the Pretenders, which he felt was one of the sillier concepts.

In September, the companion series, The Transformers: Spotlight was launched, set to last for five issues. Furman drew upon classic stories for Shockwave, re-created the personalities of Hot Rod and Ultra Magnus, and wrote Sixshot for the first time. Nightbeat's story laid a vital seed for future stories, as well as allowing him to re-invent the Micromasters. In November The Transformers: Escalation began, a direct sequel to Infiltration. It put Optimus and Megatron center stage, and brought in characters from the Spotlights. The Spotlights expanded as IDW accepted Furman's willingness to write for any character. This has even included Wheelie, a character he has personally voiced criticism of in the past.

Furman took a break from the main storyline in June to allow Eric Holmes to write the prequel, The Transformers: Megatron Origin over four months. Holmes conceived the tale for his favorite character, Megatron, and to explore the beginnings of the Autobot-Decepticon war, collaborating with Furman to further tie-in the story into the existing continuity and taking historical inspiration from the decline of the Roman Empire. In addition, Furman allowed Nick Roche to write and draw a Spotlight for Kup, and Roche also wishes to create another one for Rumble. Furman returned for The Transformers: Devastation, which will be affected by Galvatron's Spotlight (itself spinning out of Nightbeat's), before leading into The Transformers: Revelation. Galvatron was re-invented as a separate character from Megatron, and Optimus Prime himself received a Spotlight, with both one-shots including major revelations that will affect storylines beyond Revelation. Devastation had a faster pace and explored rebellion in the Decepticon ranks, similar to the early Marvel stories. With the conclusion of Devastation, Revelation began in June. However, this series had a different format to that seen previously, and consisted of four interrelated Spotlight issues that brought several of the elements of the storyline thus far, most notably the Dead Universe storyline, to a conclusion. The arc following Revelation  was a twelve-issue limited series, later expanded to sixteen issues, titled All Hail Megatron which began in July 2008, taking place a year after the end of Devastation and focusing on an Earth conquered by the Decepticons without the Autobots around to stop them, this time written by Shane McCarthy. A planned storyline, Expansion, has now been canceled, although some of the themes the series would have dealt with may still appear. A new mini-series by Furman, Maximum Dinobots, spun out of Spotlight: Grimlock and featured the Dinobots, Sunstreaker, and the Machination, beginning in December after the conclusion of Revelation, with art by Spotlight artist Nick Roche.

Starting in November 2009, an ongoing series of the Transformers was launched and ended in December 2011. Concurrently, during this time, other mini-series were also published: Last Stand of the Wreckers, Bumblebee, Ironhide, Drift, Infestation and Heart of Darkness, the latter of which led into the story arc Chaos.

Second era
Following a one-shot titled The Death of Optimus Prime, two new ongoing series started in January 2012, Robots in Disguise and More than Meets the Eye. A digital Transformers comic also became available titled Autocracy, consisting of 12 eight-page issues. Two sequels to Autocracy titled Monstrosity and Primacy started publishing in March 2013 and August 2014, respectively. In April and November 2014, the Windblade and Drift – Empire of Stone mini-series were also published. In addition, in November 2014, The Transformers: Robots in Disguise changed its title to just The Transformers. A second ongoing series of Windblade started in March 2015, and its sequel Till All Are One followed in June 2016.

Hasbro Universe
Starting in 2016, the Transformers comics became part of the Hasbro Comic Book Universe, playing a role during the crossover events Revolution and First Strike. After Revolution ended in November 2016, Transformers and More than Meets the Eye re-titled themselves to Optimus Prime and Lost Light, respectively.

The miniseries titled Transformers: Unicron (which is the finale of this continuity) started being published on May 5, 2018.

List of titles

Collected editions
The Transformers has been collected in twenty volumes roughly in chronological order. The first eight volumes, under the title Transformers: IDW Collection, collect most of the series in between Infiltration and Heart of Darkness, including Spotlights. Starting with the issue Death of Optimus Prime, the Transformers are collected under the title Transformers: IDW Collection Phase Two, of which twelve volumes were published. From the Revolution mini-series and the establishment of the Hasbro Comic Book Universe, the Transformers are going to be collected under the title Transformers: IDW Collection Phase Three.

Hardcover editions

Chronological comic order 
This is a chronological listing of the comics in which the timeline of events developed.

References

External links 
 IDW Transformers Official Site
 Simon Furman: The Blog
 Question to Mr. Furman about TF time units – Furman explains on official forum as to time frame
 Transformers Archive – Issue summaries
 

Transformers comics
IDW Publishing titles
2005 comics debuts
2018 comics endings
Comic book reboots
Comic book lines